Virginie Rausch (12 October 1906 – 9 February 1993) was a Luxembourgian swimmer. She competed in the women's 200 metre breaststroke event at the 1928 Summer Olympics.

References

1906 births
1993 deaths
Luxembourgian female swimmers
Olympic swimmers of Luxembourg
Swimmers at the 1928 Summer Olympics
Sportspeople from Luxembourg City